Priya Saraiya (born 19 November 1984) is an Indian playback singer and lyricist in Bollywood. She is also a live stage singer for Bollywood and Gujarati Folk Songs.

Education and early life

Music Education 
Priya Saraiya also known as Priya Panchal started singing at the age of six. She took Hindustani Classical vocal training from Gandharva Mahavidyalaya, Mumbai. She has trained in western music from Trinity College of Music, London's branch in Mumbai.

As a child artist, she travelled extensively with music directors Kalyanji–Anandji's group - Little Wonders/ Little Stars, performing in live stage shows all over the world. She also trained under them.

Personal life
She is married to the musician Jigar Saraiya of the music duo Sachin–Jigar, also her most frequent collaborators for Bollywood songs.

Songs

Bollywood Film Songs as Singer

Bollywood Film Songs as Lyricist

Other Songs as Lyricist

Other Appearances

Independent Song as Composer, Singer, Lyricist 
 Birdaadi (Gujarati Language) 
Loot (Hindi Language)

Awards and nominations

References

1984 births
21st-century Indian singers
Living people
Indian women playback singers
Bollywood playback singers
Indian women pop singers
Singers from Mumbai
Performers of Hindu music
Women musicians from Maharashtra
21st-century Indian women singers